Somsak Thepsuthin (born 13 January 1955) is a Thai politician.  he serves as Minister of Justice in the second cabinet of Prime Minister Prayut Chan-o-cha.

Life and education 
Somsak was born and raised in Sukhothai Province and later attended Amnuay Silpa School in Bangkok. He completed a Bachelor of Engineering from King Mongkut's Institute of Technology Ladkrabang and a master's degree in political science (public administration) from Thammasat University. He was elected Member of Parliament representing Sukhothai Province's first constituency for the first time in 1983. A member of the Social Action Party, he was confirmed in every election until 2001.

Political careers 
He served as deputy minister of public health in Suchinda Kraprayoon's cabinet from April to May 1992 (during Black May). From September 1992 to September 1993 he served as deputy minister of transport and communication under Chuan Leekpai and again from September 1996 to October 1997 under Chavalit Yongchaiyudh. Subsequently, he was shortly Minister of Public Health under the same prime minister until the government's resignation in the following month. In the second government of Chuan Leekpai, Somsak was the Minister of Industry from November 1997 to October 1998. 

Having switched to Thaksin Shinawatra's Thai Rak Thai Party (TRT), Somsak was elected to the House of Representatives on the TRT party-list in the 2001 general election, while his wife Anongwan Thepsuthin succeeded him as MP for the first constituency of Sukhothai Province. In Thaksin's government that came into office in September 2001, Somsak first served as Minister to the Office of the Prime Minister, before switching to the Ministry of Industry in October 2002 and the Ministry of Agriculture in November 2003. In Thaksin's second government, Somsak held the office of Minister of Tourism and Sports from March to August 2005 and subsequently Minister of Labour until the 19 September 2006 coup d'état. 

Being a member of the TRT party's executive committee, Somsak was barred from holding political office for five years upon the dissolution of the party by the Constitutional Court. Nevertheless, he founded the Matchima ("neutral") group, that first merged into Sanoh Thienthong Pracharaj Party before separating and becoming the Neutral Democratic Party (NDP) in October 2007. As Somsak was officially barred, his wife Anongwan became the party's secretary-general. The party won seven constituency seats in the December 2007 general election and joined the government coalition led by People's Power Party (PPP) and Samak Sundaravej. In Samak's government and that of his successor Somchai Wongsawat, Anongwan Thepsuthin served as Minister of Natural Resources and Environment from February to December 2008. The Constitutional Court dissolved the Neutral Democratic Party together with its coalition partners PPP and Thai Nation Party for election fraud on 2 December 2008.

References 

Living people
1955 births
Somsak Thepsuthin
Somsak Thepsuthin
Somsak Thepsuthin
Somsak Thepsuthin
Somsak Thepsuthin
Somsak Thepsuthin
Somsak Thepsuthin
Somsak Thepsuthin
Somsak Thepsuthin
Somsak Thepsuthin
Somsak Thepsuthin